Opuntia alta is a cactus species in the genus Opuntia.

Identification 
It resembles Opuntia lindheimeri, and immature specimens can be mistaken for that taxon. Mature O. alta plants form discrete trunks and have small fruits. Unlike O. lindheimeri, the flowers have pale stigmas.

Opuntia alta is probably closely related to Opuntia cacanapa, which grows further inland.

Gallery

References

External links
Opuntia alta photo gallery at Opuntia Web, opuntiads.com

	

alta